The 2001 Denmark Open in badminton was held in Farum, Copenhagen, from October 16 to October 21, 2001. It was a five-star tournament and the prize money was US$250,000.

Venue
Farum Hallen, Farum, Copenhagen

Final results

References

Denmark Open
Denmark